Worthington Hoskin (8 May 1885 – 4 March 1956) was an English cricketer. He played for Gloucestershire between 1907 and 1912. He attended St. Andrew's College, Grahamstown, South Africa and was awarded a Rhodes Scholarship in 1904.

References

1885 births
1956 deaths
English cricketers
Gloucestershire cricketers
Alumni of St. Andrew's College, Grahamstown
Alumni of Trinity College, Oxford
Oxford University cricketers